Chennai Music Season is an event hosted every Mid November–January in  Chennai (formerly known as Madras)
Tamil Nadu. Spanning some 9 weeks, it comprises top-flight professional and amateur musicians . The traditional role of the Music Season is to allow aficionados of Carnatic music to appreciate performances by renowned artists, and to allow promising young artists to display their talent and skill. Audiences and artists come from across India and her diaspora to enjoy the season.

History
The Madras Music Season was first created in the 1927 by a group of individuals who later went on to establish the Madras Music Academy. Concerts would be held at various venues at different places every year, before the Madras Music Academy settled on its present venue at T.T.K. Road. Although the season was initially held during March/April (the Tamil month of Panguni), the timing of the season was later changed to December (the Tamil month of Maargazhi) due to more favourable weather conditions and the likelihood of attracting more tourists during this period.

The All India Music Conference was held in 1927 concurrently with the annual session of Indian National Congress in Madras. A resolution was passed at the conference to formally establish the Madras Music Academy. From 1928, the academy started organizing the Music Season every year during the month of December.

Previously it was a traditional month-long Carnatic music festival solely consisting of Carnatic music concerts, harikathas, lecture demonstrations (otherwise known as lec-dems) and award/title ceremonies. However, over the years it has also diversified into dance and drama, as well as non-Carnatic art forms, and is now of a duration of at least six weeks.

The festival
The Music Season has grown over the years, and has been described as one of the world's largest cultural events. Generally, the concerts take place in the afternoons and nights, and consists of all sorts of Carnatic music compositions and improvisations. In 2004–2005, there were over 1200 performances by about 600 artists (about 700 vocal, 250 instrumental, 200 dance, 50 drama and others).

Sabhas and Halls
The performances are typically organised by sabhās. A Carnatic sabhaa is an organisation that helps conduct concerts and bestow titles and awards to artists to recognise talent. Most sabhaas own a hall (or two). Some smaller sabhaas rent a hall during the season. Generally, the main halls, on average, can accommodate about 300 people while the mini can take no more than 75 people. Most performances are held in such halls.

Prominent Sabhas
The following prominent sabhaas have regularly organised concerts during the Music Season:

 Brahma Gaana Sabhaa: Sivagami Pethaachi  Auditorium
 Chennai Cultural Academy Trust
 Indian Fine Arts Society: Baala Mandir German Hall
 Kalaarasana: Rani Seethai Hall
 Kalaa Pradarshini: Bhaarathiya Vidyaa Bhavan Auditorium, Mylapore
 Kaartik Fine Arts
 Madras Music Academy: T. T. Krishnamachari Auditorium
 Mudra : Freedom Hall
 Mylapore Fine Arts Club
 Naadha Inbam : Raaga Sudhaa Hall
 Narada Gana Sabha: Sathguru Gnaanananda Hall
 Rasika Ranjani Sabhaa : Dakshinamoorthy Auditorium
 Sri Krishna Gaana Sabhaa: Sri Krishna Gaana Sabhaa
 Sri Paarthasaarathy Swaami Sabhaa : Vidyaa Bhaarathi
 Sri Thyaaga Brahma Gaana Sabhaa: Vaani Mahaal
 Tamil Isai Sangam: Raja Annaamalai Chettiar Hall
 Hamsadhwani NRI Sabha
 Singapore Indian Fine Arts Society : Tatvaloka, Teynampet
 Triplicane Music Festival; NKT Muthu Hall
 TAPAS Music and Dance Festival
 Sat Sangam Sabhaa - Madipaakkam
 Chennaiyil Thiruvaiyaaru - Kaamaraajar Arangam

Free Kutcheris
Most of the Sabhas have free concerts in the morning and afternoon slots. Only the evening slots starting from around 4 pm are ticketed in most Sabhas.

All Concerts at Bharathi Vidya Bhavan are free. They start the season a bit ahead but all popular artists sing here. SIFA holds concerts at Tattvaloka, Teynampet and all concerts are free
Concerts at Narada Gana Sabha mini hall, Obul reddy hall at Vani Mahal and Kamakoti hall in Krishna Gana Sabha are also usually free.

The Music Season 2013 was when live Streaming technology embraced carnatic music when Parivadini launched the first Parivadini award and also started streaming live carnatic concerts for free.

Season tickets and tickets for Individual concerts

Season tickets are available at various denominations in all major Sabhas.
At the music academy, season tickets are mostly sold out on the first day, which is mostly in the first week of December.
Individual concerts tickets are available only starting from morning on the day of the concert

Most of the other Sabhas have advance booking for individual concerts, at the respective venues, mostly starting from First week of December. Brahma Gana Sabha and the Chennaiyil Thiruvayyaru have online ticket booking facility.

See also

List of Indian classical music festivals

Notes

References

External links
Editorial in The Hindu
Madras Music Academy
carnatic india Page on Chennai music season 2008 -09
ART INDIA Information on Concerts

Carnatic music
Culture of Chennai
Music festivals in India
Carnatic classical music festivals
1927 establishments in India
Tamil festivals
Music festivals established in 1927
Hindu music festivals
Events in Chennai